"Get Into It (Yuh)" is a song by American rapper and singer Doja Cat from her third studio album Planet Her (2021). It was released through Kemosabe and RCA Records alongside the parent album as an album track. Following the album's release, it entered various international music charts due to going viral on the video-sharing app TikTok. The song also appeared in a 2021 Taco Bell advertisement. Following premiere of the music video on January 28, 2022, the song was released to radio as the album's fifth and final single on March 11, 2022.

Composition and lyrics 
A "squeaky swag" rap song featuring "glitchy", "twinkling" and "quirky" production influenced by dancehall and bubblegum, "Get Into It (Yuh)" is a tribute to rapper Nicki Minaj, whom Doja Cat thanks directly for "paving the way for her polished pop-rap career" by saying "Thank you Nicki, I love you!" towards the end of the song. Throughout the song she borrows the unique rapid-fire flow Minaj commonly used in her early career and even interpolates the lyric "Got that big rocket launcher" from her 2010 debut single "Massive Attack". Shortly after the release of the song, Minaj revealed in a fan's Twitter Space conversation that Doja Cat had originally asked her to feature on the song, but passed on the collaboration due to thinking she could not bring anything unique and improve the song. Minaj had asked Doja's team to send her another song, but they never did.

Critical reception 
"Get Into It (Yuh)" received acclaim upon release, reviewers often comparing it to Nicki Minaj's work and Playboi Carti. Consequence described the track as "swaggering", while Clash dubbed it "playful". DIY cites the track as a "vibe-heavy" highlight, complimenting Doja Cat's "fiery rapping style". Sputnikmusic was less positive, dubbing the song's production as an "excuse for grating repetitiousness".

English singer Charli XCX named "Get Into It (Yuh)" the song of the year that "absolutely no one [would] top ... in 2021".

Accolades

Commercial performance 
"Get Into It (Yuh)" debuted on the US Billboard Hot 100 at number 93 in the week of July 10, 2021. A dance—choreographed by David Vu on TikTok, uploaded in late July—fueled a boost in streaming, causing the track to re-enter the chart at 75 roughly two months later on the week of August 28, 2021. Following its release to US radio as a single, the song reached a new peak of number 20 in July 2022. In addition to its success in the United States, the track has also reached the top 40 in Canada and New Zealand.

Music video
The music video was filmed in October 2021, directed by Mike Diva. In November 2021, Marketing Dive and PR Newswire reported that a music video for the song was under production in association with Lifewtr. An accompanying trailer for the music video was released on January 28, 2022. The video was later released to YouTube on January 31, 2022.

Charts

Weekly charts

Year-end charts

Certifications

Release history

References 

2021 songs
2022 singles
Doja Cat songs
Songs written by Doja Cat
Kemosabe Records singles
RCA Records singles